This is a complete list of ice hockey players who were drafted in the Kontinental Hockey League Junior draft by the Dinamo Riga franchise. It includes every player who was drafted, regardless of whether they played for the team. Roberts Bukarts became the Dinamo first junior draft pick during the 2009 KHL Junior Draft.

Key

Draft picks
Statistics are complete as of the 2014–15 KHL season and show each player's career regular season totals in the KHL.  Wins, losses, ties, overtime losses and goals against average apply to goaltenders and are used only for players at that position. A player listed with a dash under the games played column has not played in the KHL.

See also
2009 KHL Junior Draft
2010 KHL Junior Draft
2011 KHL Junior Draft
2012 KHL Junior Draft
2013 KHL Junior Draft

References

Specific

General 
2009 KHL Junior Draft: 
2010 KHL Junior Draft: 
2011 KHL Junior Draft: 
2012 KHL Junior Draft: 
2013 KHL Junior Draft: 
2014 KHL Junior Draft: 
2015 KHL Junior Draft: 

         
Kontinental Hockey League Junior Draft